Fernand Saivé (24 May 1900 – 12 April 1981) was a Belgian cyclist. He competed in three events at the 1924 Summer Olympics winning a silver medal in the men's team trial and a bronze in the men's team pursuit.

References

External links
 

1900 births
1981 deaths
Belgian male cyclists
Olympic cyclists of Belgium
Cyclists at the 1924 Summer Olympics
Olympic silver medalists for Belgium
Olympic bronze medalists for Belgium
Olympic medalists in cycling
Medalists at the 1924 Summer Olympics
Walloon sportspeople
Cyclists from Liège Province
People from Dison
20th-century Belgian people